This list of Mondelez International brands (formerly Kraft Foods Inc.) includes brand-name products that are developed, owned, licensed, or distributed by Mondelez International. The company's core businesses are snack foods and confectionery. In certain international territories, Kraft-branded products are made by Mondelez under license from Kraft Heinz Company since 2012.

Current brands

 Africana (Romania)
 Back to Nature
 Better Cheddars
 Cadbury
 Cameo (biscuits)
 Capri Sun juice drink (Philippines and Mexico)
 Charada (Peru)
 Cheezels (Malaysia)
 Chicken in a Biskit
 Chipsmore (Malaysia, Singapore)
 Chipita
 Clight
 Club Social (crackers)
 Côte d'Or (chocolate)
 CornNuts (snack food)
 Coronita (Peru)
 Dairylea/Susanna cheese spread (Europe)
 Delicje Szampańskie (jaffa cakes, Poland)
 Easy Cheese
 Eden (Philippines)
 El Caserío (Spain)
 Estrella (Lithuania)
 Field (Peru)
 Figaro (Chocolate) (Slovakia, Czech Republic)
 Filipinos (snack food) (Spain, Portugal)
 Fontaneda (biscuits) (Spain)
 Freia (chocolate) (Norway)
 Győri Keksz (biscuits Hungary)
 Handi-Snacks
 Harvest Crisps
 Honey Maid indigo
 In-A-Biskit (Australia)
 Jacob's biscuits (Malaysia)
 Japp (Scandinavia)
 Jiagai (China)
 Kandia (Romania)Kandia
 Kong Haakon (Norway)
 Kolonáda (Czech Republic)
 Korona (Chocolate) (Ukraine)
 Karuna (Chocolate) (Lithuania)
 Kraft Singles (pasteurized prepared cheese product) (under license outside North America, name retired in Australia)
 Kraker Bran
 Lacta (Brazil)
 Lacta (Greece)
 Liga (Netherlands)
 LU (biscuits)
 Lunchables
 Lyuks (potato chips) (Ukraine)
 Milka
 Miracle Whip salad dressing spread (Germany)
 Mostro (Peru)
 Non-Stop (Scandinavia)
 O'boy (Scandinavia, Estonia)
 O'smile (Taiwan)
 Opavia (Czech republic, Slovakia)
 Orchard Crisps
 Pacific  crackers (China)
 Pavlidis (Greece)
 Philadelphia Cream Cheese (outside North America)
 Pigrolac
 Poiana (Romania)
 Prince Polo (Poland)
 Ritz Metro
 Seven Seas (salad dressings)
 Saimaza (Spain)
 Simmenthal (canned meat)
 Snackabouts
 Sport szelet (Hungary)
 Svoge (Bulgaria)
 Swiss Crackers
 Sugar Wafers
 Tang (outside North America)
 Terrabusi (Argentina)
 Tiger Energy Biscuits (Southeast Asian countries)
 Toasted Chips
 Toblerone
 Twisties (Malaysia)
 Uguan (China)

Former brands
 Philadelphia To Go Bagel & Cream Cheese – a former bagel and cream cheese convenience food product that was introduced by Kraft Foods in 2003.
 Planters

Brands table

See also

References

Mondelez International brands
Mondelez International
Mondelez International